The Municipal election for Rajbiraj were held in 13 May 2022 to elect a mayor, a deputy mayor, 16 ward chairperson and ward members. All positions are for a period of 5 years.
A secondary election is to be held for the municipal executives which will elect 5 women from the elected ward members and 3 members who must be from the Dalit and minority community. The electorate for this election will be the 82 members chosen by direct election.
Janata Samajwadi Party mayoral candidate Bhimraj Yadav was elected as a Mayor of Rajbiraj by securing 9,624 votes.

Background 
The last local level elections were held in 2017. With the passing of a new constitution in 2015, a commission was formed to restructure the existing local levels into more powerful and autonomous local bodies. The city limits of Rajbiraj were changed during this restructuring and the number of wards was increased from 10 to 16. Electors in each ward will elect a ward chairperson and 4 ward members. Out of 4 ward members, 2 must be female and one of the 2 females must belong to the Dalit community.

Voters
Election Commission of Nepal is the responsible body to update and publish the final electoral rolls before the election in Nepal. The election commission had published the final voter list for the local level election on March 27. There is a total of 39,692 registered voters who can cast their vote in Rajbiraj municipal election.
The Ward wise electoral details for the 2022 Rajbiraj municipal election:

Election schedule 
On March 24, the Election commission of Nepal announced the election schedule for the local election.

Candidates

Mayor Candidates

Shambhu Prasad Yadav 
Shambhu Prasad Yadav, the Mayor of Rajbiraj Municipilaty was elected in 2017. He was elected as a Mayor in local level elections from Rastriya Janata Party Nepal. After the merger of political parties, he joined People's Socialist Party, Nepal in 2020. He is now contesting for the Mayor's candidacy from Communist Party of Nepal (Maoist Centre) after resigning from his mayoral post.

Bhimraj Yadav
Bhimraj Yadav is the candidate from People's Socialist Party, Nepal. He was previously contested for the Mayor candidacy in 2017 local level election from Federal Socialist Forum, Nepal and lost by 15 votes. He was previously associated with Federation Of Contractors' Associations, Saptari.

Candidates list (Mayor and Deputy Mayor)

Candidate list (Ward Chairperson)

Voters turnout 
The Election commission of Nepal has scheduled the polling time from early 7:00 am NST to 17:00 pm NST on 13 May 2022. There are total 27 polling stations and 52 voting booths in Rajbiraj municipal election.

Election day gallery

Results

Mayoral election

Deputy-Mayoral election

Ward results

Ward wise electoral details

Summary of results by ward

See also 
 2022 Nepalese local elections
 2022 Lalitpur municipal election
 2017 Kathmandu municipal election
 2022 Janakpur municipal election
 2022 Bharatpur municipal election

References

Rajbiraj